The Nightmare Before Christmas is a 1993 film produced by Tim Burton.

The Nightmare Before Christmas may also refer to:

 The Nightmare Before Christmas (soundtrack), a soundtrack album from the film
 The Nightmare Before Christmas Trading Card Game, a collectible card game
 The Nightmare Before Christmas: The Pumpkin King, a 2005 video game for the Game Boy Advance
 The Nightmare Before Christmas: Oogie's Revenge, a 2005 video game for the PlayStation 2 and Xbox
 Nightmare Before Christmas, a 2010 installment of the UK music festival All Tomorrow's Parties

See also 
 The Night Before Christmas (disambiguation)